The 29th GLAAD Media Awards was the 2018 annual presentation of the GLAAD Media Awards, presented by GLAAD honoring the 2017 media season. The awards honor films, television shows, musicians and works of journalism that fairly and accurately represent the LGBT community and issues relevant to the community. GLAAD announced over 100 nominees in 21 English-language categories in January 2018. Some of the awards were presented in Los Angeles on April 12, 2018 and the remaining awards were presented in New York City on May 5, 2018. The Outstanding Kids & Family Programming Award category was introduced for the first time in this ceremony. At the April 12 ceremony, Britney Spears received the Vanguard Award and Jim Parsons the Stephen F. Kolzak Award, presented by Ricky Martin and Ryan Murphy respectively.

Winners and nominees
Winners are presented in bold.

Film

Television

Other

References

GLAAD Media Awards ceremonies
GLAAD
2018 in New York City
2018 in Los Angeles